Kiwifruit (often shortened to kiwi in North American, British and continental European English) or Chinese gooseberry is the edible berry of several species of woody vines in the genus Actinidia. It has a thin, fuzzy, fibrous, tart but edible light brown skin and light green or golden flesh with rows of tiny, black, edible seeds. The fruit has a soft texture with a sweet and unique flavour. 

Kiwifruit is native to central and eastern China. The first recorded description of the kiwifruit dates to the 12th century during the Song dynasty. In the early 20th century, cultivation of kiwifruit spread from China to New Zealand, where the first commercial plantings occurred. The fruit became popular with British and American servicemen stationed in New Zealand during World War II, and later became commonly exported, first to Great Britain and then to California in the 1960s.

Etymology
Early varieties were described in a 1904 nursery catalogue as having "...edible fruits the size of walnuts, and the flavour of ripe gooseberries", leading to the name Chinese gooseberry. In 1962, New Zealand growers began calling it "kiwifruit" due to its fuzzy appearance similar to the kiwi bird for export marketing, and the name was first registered by Turners & Growers on 15 June 1959 and later commercially adopted in 1974. In New Zealand and Australia, the word "kiwi" alone either refers solely to the bird or is used as a nickname for New Zealanders; it is almost never used to refer to the fruit. Kiwifruit has since become a common name for all commercially grown green kiwifruit from the genus Actinidia. In the United States and Canada, the shortened name kiwi is commonly used when referring to the fruit.

History

Kiwifruit is native to central and eastern China. The first recorded description of the kiwifruit dates to 12th century China during the Song dynasty. As it was usually collected from the wild and consumed for medicinal purposes, the plant was rarely cultivated or bred. Cultivation of kiwifruit spread from China in the early 20th century to New Zealand, where the first commercial plantings occurred. The fruit became popular with British and American servicemen stationed in New Zealand during World War II, and was later exported, first to Great Britain and then to California in the 1960s.

In New Zealand during the 1940s and 1950s, the fruit became an agricultural commodity through the development of commercially viable cultivars, agricultural practices, shipping, storage, and marketing.

Species and cultivars

The genus Actinidia comprises around 60 species. Their fruits are quite variable, although most are easily recognised as kiwifruit because of their appearance and shape. The skin of the fruit varies in size, hairiness and colour. The flesh varies in colour, juiciness, texture and taste. Some fruits are unpalatable, while others taste considerably better than the majority of commercial cultivars.

The most commonly sold kiwifruit is derived from A. deliciosa (fuzzy kiwifruit). Other species that are commonly eaten include A. chinensis (golden kiwifruit), A. coriacea (Chinese egg gooseberry), A. arguta (hardy kiwifruit), A. kolomikta (Arctic kiwifruit), A. melanandra (purple kiwifruit), A. polygama (silver vine) and A. purpurea (hearty red kiwifruit).

Fuzzy kiwifruit

Most kiwifruit sold belongs to a few cultivars of A. deliciosa (fuzzy kiwifruit): 'Hayward', 'Blake' and 'Saanichton 12'. They have a fuzzy, dull brown skin and bright green flesh. The familiar cultivar 'Hayward' was developed by Hayward Wright in Avondale, New Zealand, around 1924. It was initially grown in domestic gardens, but commercial planting began in the 1940s.

'Hayward' is the most commonly available cultivar in stores. It is a large, egg-shaped fruit with a sweet flavour. 'Saanichton 12', from British Columbia, is somewhat more rectangular than 'Hayward' and comparably sweet, but the inner core of the fruit can be tough. 'Blake' can self-pollinate, but it has a smaller, more oval fruit and the flavour is considered inferior.

Kiwi berries
Kiwi berries are edible fruits the size of a large grape, similar to fuzzy kiwifruit in taste and internal appearance but with a thin, smooth green skin. They are primarily produced by three species: Actinidia arguta (hardy kiwi), A. kolomikta (Arctic kiwifruit) and A. polygama (silver vine). They are fast-growing, climbing vines, durable over their growing season. They are referred to as "kiwi berry, baby kiwi, dessert kiwi, grape kiwi, or cocktail kiwi".

The cultivar 'Issai' is a hybrid of hardy kiwi and silver vine which can self-pollinate. Grown commercially because of its relatively large fruit, 'Issai' is less hardy than most hardy kiwi.

Actinidia chinensis

Actinidia chinensis (yellow kiwi or golden kiwifruit) has a smooth, bronze skin, with a beak shape at the stem attachment. Flesh colour varies from bright green to a clear, intense yellow. This species is 'sweeter and more aromatic' in flavour compared to A. deliciosa, similar to some subtropical fruits. One of the most attractive varieties has a red 'iris' around the centre of the fruit and yellow flesh outside. The yellow fruit obtains a higher market price and, being less hairy than the fuzzy kiwifruit, is more palatable for consumption without peeling.

A commercially viable variety of this red-ringed kiwifruit, patented as EnzaRed, is a cultivar of the Chinese hong yang variety.

'Hort16A' is a golden kiwifruit cultivar marketed worldwide as Zespri Gold. This cultivar suffered significant losses in New Zealand in 2010–2013 due to the PSA bacterium. A new cultivar of golden kiwifruit, Gold3, was found to be more disease-resistant and most growers have now changed to this cultivar. 'Gold3', marketed by Zespri as SunGold is not quite as sweet as 'Hort16A', and lacks its usually slightly pointed tip.

Clones of the new variety SunGold have been used to develop orchards in China, resulting in partially successful legal efforts in China by Zespri to protect their intellectual property. In 2021, Zespri estimated that around 5,000 hectares of Sungold orchards were being cultivated in China, mainly in the Sichuan province.

Cultivation
Kiwifruit can be grown in most temperate climates with adequate summer heat. Where fuzzy kiwifruit (A. deliciosa) is not hardy, other species can be grown as substitutes.

Breeding

Often in commercial farming, different breeds are used for rootstock, fruit bearing plants and pollinators. Therefore, the seeds produced are crossbreeds of their parents. Even if the same breeds are used for pollinators and fruit bearing plants, there is no guarantee that the fruit will have the same quality as the parent. Additionally, seedlings take seven years before they flower, so determining whether the kiwi is fruit bearing or a pollinator is time-consuming. Therefore, most kiwifruits, with the exception of rootstock and new cultivars, are propagated asexually. This is done by grafting the fruit producing plant onto rootstock grown from seedlings or, if the plant is desired to be a true cultivar, rootstock grown from cuttings of a mature plant.

Pollination

Kiwifruit plants generally are dioecious, meaning a plant is either male or female. The male plants have flowers that produce pollen, the females receive the pollen to fertilise their ovules and grow fruit; most kiwifruit requires a male plant to pollinate the female plant. For a good yield of fruit, one male vine for every three to eight female vines is considered adequate. Some varieties can self pollinate, but even they produce a greater and more reliable yield when pollinated by male kiwifruit. Cross-species pollination is often (but not always) successful as long as bloom times are synchronised.

In nature, the species are pollinated by birds and native bumblebees, which visit the flowers for pollen, not nectar. The female flowers produce fake anthers with what appears to be pollen on the tips in order to attract the pollinators, although these fake anthers lack the DNA and food value of the male anthers.

Kiwifruit growers rely on honey bees, the principal ‘for-hire’ pollinator, but commercially grown kiwifruit is notoriously difficult to pollinate. The flowers are not very attractive to honey bees, in part because the flowers do not produce nectar and bees quickly learn to prefer flowers with nectar.

Honey bees are inefficient cross-pollinators for kiwifruit because they practice “floral fidelity”. Each honey bee visits only a single type of flower in any foray and maybe only a few branches of a single plant. The pollen needed from a different plant (such as a male for a female kiwifruit) might never reach it were it not for the cross-pollination that principally occurs in the crowded colony; it is in the colonies that bees laden with different pollen literally cross paths.

To deal with these pollination challenges, some producers blow collected pollen over the female flowers. Most common, though, is saturation pollination, in which the honey bee populations are made so large (by placing hives in the orchards at a concentration of about 8 hives per hectare) that bees are forced to use this flower because of intense competition for all flowers within flight distance.

Maturation and harvest
Kiwifruit is picked by hand and commercially grown on sturdy support structures, as it can produce several tonnes per hectare, more than the rather weak vines can support. These are generally equipped with a watering system for irrigation and frost protection in the spring.

Kiwifruit vines require vigorous pruning, similar to that of grapevines. Fruit is borne on 'one-year-old and older' canes, but production declines as each cane ages. Canes should be pruned off and replaced after their third year. In the northern hemisphere the fruit ripens in November, while in the southern it ripens in May. The plants produce their maximum at eight to ten years old. The seasonal yields are variable; a heavy crop on a vine one season generally comes with a light crop the following season.

Storage
Fruits harvested when firm will ripen when stored properly for long periods. This allows fruit to be sent to market up to 8 weeks after harvest.

Firm kiwifruit ripen after a few days to a week when stored at room temperature, but should not be kept in direct sunlight. Faster ripening occurs when placed in a paper bag with an apple, pear, or banana. Once a kiwifruit is ripe, however, it is preserved optimally when stored far from other fruits, as it is very sensitive to the ethylene gas they may emit, thereby tending to over-ripen even in the refrigerator. If stored appropriately, ripe kiwifruit normally keep for about one to two weeks.

Pests and diseases
Pseudomonas syringae actinidiae (PSA) was first identified in Japan in the 1980s. This bacterial strain has been controlled and managed successfully in orchards in Asia. In 1992, it was found in northern Italy. In 2007/2008, economic losses were observed, as a more virulent strain became more dominant (PSA V). In 2010 it was found in New Zealand's Bay of Plenty Region kiwifruit orchards in the North Island. The yellow-fleshed cultivars were particularly susceptible. New, resistant varieties were selected in research funded by the government and fruit growers so that the industry could continue.

Scientists reported they had worked out the strain of PSA affecting kiwifruit from New Zealand, Italy and Chile originated in China.

Production

In 2020, global production of kiwifruit was 4 million tonnes, led by China with slightly more than half of the world total. New Zealand, Italy, Greece, Iran and Chile were other significant producers. In China, kiwifruit is grown mainly in the mountainous area upstream of the Yangtze River, as well as Sichuan.

Production history
Kiwifruit exports rapidly increased from the late '1960s to early 1970s' in New Zealand. By 1976, exports exceeded the amount consumed domestically. Outside of Australasia, New Zealand kiwifruit are marketed under the brand-name label, Zespri. The general name, "Zespri", has been used for marketing of all cultivars of kiwifruit from New Zealand since 2012.

In the 1980s, many countries outside New Zealand began to grow and export kiwifruit. In Italy, the infrastructure and techniques required to support grape production were adapted to the kiwifruit. This, coupled with being close to the European kiwifruit market, led to Italians becoming the leading producer of kiwifruit 'in 1989'. The growing season of Italian kiwifruit does not overlap much with the New Zealand or the Chilean growing seasons, therefore direct competition between New Zealand or Chile was not a significant factor.

Much of the breeding to refine the green kiwifruit was undertaken by the Plant & Food Research Institute (formerly HortResearch) during the decades of  '1970–1999'. In 1990, the New Zealand Kiwifruit Marketing Board opened an office for Europe in Antwerp, Belgium.

Human consumption

Kiwifruit may be eaten raw, made into juices, used in baked goods, prepared with meat or used as a garnish. The whole fruit, including the skin, is suitable for human consumption; however, the skin of the fuzzy varieties is often discarded due to its texture. Sliced kiwifruit has long been used as a garnish atop whipped cream on pavlova, a meringue-based dessert. Traditionally in China, kiwifruit was not eaten for pleasure, but was given as medicine to children to help them grow and to women who have given birth to help them recover.

Raw kiwifruit contains actinidain (also spelled actinidin) which is commercially useful as a meat tenderizer and possibly as a digestive aid. Actinidain also makes raw kiwifruit unsuitable for use in desserts containing milk or any other dairy products because the enzyme digests milk proteins. This applies to gelatin-based desserts, due to the fact that the actinidain will dissolve the proteins in gelatin, causing the dessert to either liquefy or prevent it from solidifying.

Nutrition
In a  amount, green kiwifruit provides  of food energy, is 83% water and 15% carbohydrates, with negligible protein and fat (table). It is particularly rich in vitamin C (112% DV) and vitamin K (38% DV), has a moderate content of vitamin E (10% DV), with no other micronutrients in significant content. Gold kiwifruit has similar nutritional value to green kiwifruit, but contains higher vitamin C content (194% DV) and insignificant vitamin K content (table).

Kiwifruit seed oil contains on average 62% alpha-linolenic acid, an omega-3 fatty acid. Kiwifruit pulp contains carotenoids, such as provitamin A beta-carotene, lutein and zeaxanthin.

Allergies
Allergy to kiwifruit was first described in 1981, and there have since been reports of the allergy presenting with numerous symptoms from localized oral allergy syndrome to life-threatening anaphylaxis.

The actinidain found in kiwifruit can be an allergen for some individuals, including children. The most common symptoms are unpleasant itching and soreness of the mouth, with wheezing as the most common severe symptom; anaphylaxis may occur.

References

Further reading

External links 
 
 

 
Actinidia
Edible fruits
Berries
Chinese fruit
Food plant cultivars
Garden plants of Asia
Vines